The 2014 Italian motorcycle Grand Prix was the sixth round of the 2014 MotoGP season. It was held at the Mugello Circuit in Scarperia on 1 June 2014.

Classification

MotoGP

Moto2

Moto3

Championship standings after the race (MotoGP)
Below are the standings for the top five riders and constructors after round six has concluded.

Riders' Championship standings

Constructors' Championship standings

 Note: Only the top five positions are included for both sets of standings.

References

Italian
Motorcycle Grand Prix
Italian motorcycle Grand Prix
Italian motorcycle Grand Prix